Chauncey Rivers (born June 12, 1997) is an American football outside linebacker for the Houston Roughnecks of the XFL.
Rivers was undrafted in the 2020 NFL Draft.

College career

University of Georgia
As a Freshman in 2015, Rivers played in 4 games totaling 4 tackles on the season. After being arrested on marijuana charges for the third time in seven months, Rivers was dismissed from the team.

East Mississippi Community College
Rivers decided to transfer to East Mississippi Community College (EMCC) where he would play for Head Coach Buddy Stephens and was featured on the Netflix documentary series Last Chance U. After playing in 12 games for the Lions, Rivers totaled 25 solo tackles and 20 assists for a total of 45, along with 8 total sacks for a loss of 44 yards.

Mississippi State University
After his 2016 campaign at EMCC, Rivers was often considered to be among the top Junior College defensive ends in the country. This allowed him to get consideration once again from Division I colleges. After enrolling at Mississippi State University (MSU), Rivers received an academic redshirt for the 2017 season.

During his 2018 season, as a redshirt Junior, Rivers would play in all 13 games the team played, totalling 339 snaps. Rivers would make 24 tackles and miss just 1 tackle on the season. Despite not being a starter, Rivers finished fifth on the team in tackles for loss with 7 and had 2.5 sacks as well as 19 pressures.

College statistics

Professional career

Baltimore Ravens
Rivers was signed by the Baltimore Ravens as an undrafted free agent following the 2020 NFL Draft. He was waived during final roster cuts on September 5, 2020, and signed to the team's practice squad the next day. He was elevated to the active roster on December 2 for the team's week 12 game against the Pittsburgh Steelers, and reverted to the practice squad after the game. On January 18, 2021, Rivers signed a reserve/futures contract with the Ravens. He was waived on August 4, 2021.

Green Bay Packers
On August 5, 2021, Rivers was claimed off waivers by the Green Bay Packers.

In August, Rivers made the Packers’ initial 53-man roster. He was placed on injured reserve on October 7, 2021, with a torn ACL.

Houston Roughnecks 
On November 17, 2022, Rivers was drafted by the Houston Roughnecks of the XFL.

NFL career statistics

Regular season

References

External links
East Mississippi Community College Lions Bio
Mississippi State Bulldogs Bio

1997 births
Living people
People from Stone Mountain, Georgia
Players of American football from Georgia (U.S. state)
Sportspeople from DeKalb County, Georgia
Georgia Bulldogs football players
Mississippi State Bulldogs football players
Baltimore Ravens players
Green Bay Packers players
Houston Roughnecks players